Universität is a Munich U-Bahn station located in the Munich borough of Maxvorstadt. The lines U3 and U6 both call at the station. It is located directly underneath the north-south-running Ludwigstraße, one of central Munich's main traffic arteries and one of the city's Prachtstraßen. The station's location on the western edge of the Englischer Garten also makes it one of the prime access routes to the city's largest park.

Name 
The station's main purpose is to serve Ludwig-Maximilians-Universität whose main buildings are located along Ludwigstraße, Veterinärstraße and Schellingstraße.

The station has two exits: In the south on Schellingstraße and in the north on Ludwigstraße/Akademiestraße. The northern exit is built into the university buildings, allowing direct access to LMU's main building (north-west exit) and the Economics and Law faculties (north-east exit).

Places nearby 
 Ludwig-Maximilians-Universität
 Ludwigskirche
 Englischer Garten

References

External links

Munich U-Bahn stations
Railway stations in Germany opened in 1971
1971 establishments in West Germany
Railway stations at university and college campuses